The Mayer f-function is an auxiliary function that often appears in the series expansion of thermodynamic quantities related to classical many-particle systems. It is named after chemist and physicist Joseph Edward Mayer.

Definition
Consider a system of classical particles interacting through a pair-wise potential

where the bold labels  and  denote the continuous degrees of freedom associated with the particles, e.g., 

for spherically symmetric particles and

for rigid non-spherical particles where  denotes position and  the orientation parametrized e.g. by Euler angles. The Mayer f-function is then defined as

where  the inverse absolute temperature in units of (Temperature times the Boltzmann constant )−1 .

See also
Virial coefficient
Cluster expansion
Excluded volume

Notes

Special functions